Michelle Renee Forbes Guajardo (born January 8, 1965) is an American actress who has appeared on television and in independent films. Forbes gained attention for her dual role in daytime soap opera Guiding Light, for which she received a Daytime Emmy Award nomination. She is also a Saturn Award winner with three nominations.

Forbes is known for her recurring appearances on genre and drama shows such as Ensign Ro Laren in Star Trek: The Next Generation and her regular role as medical examiner Julianna Cox on Homicide: Life on the Street during the 1990s, while building her career with recurring roles throughout the 2000s in Battlestar Galactica, 24, In Treatment, Durham County, Prison Break and her series regular role as Maryann Forrester on True Blood. She has appeared in significant roles in movies such as Escape from L.A., Kalifornia, Swimming with Sharks and  Columbus.

She starred in the 2011–2012 AMC television series The Killing, for which she received a Primetime Emmy Award nomination. On June 18, 2019 it was announced that Forbes would join USA Network's action drama series Treadstone, a prequel/sequel to the Bourne franchise.

Early life 
Forbes was born in Austin, Texas, of Mexican American heritage.

Forbes hoped to become a ballet dancer. She began receiving formal acting training at the High School for the Performing and Visual Arts in Houston. While on vacation in New York City at the age of 16, she found herself auditioning for a film; although she was not selected, she signed with the William Morris Agency and began her professional acting career.

Career 

In 1987, at age 22, Forbes landed the dual roles of Solita Carrera and Sonni Carrera Lewis on the daytime soap opera Guiding Light. She performed on the show for two years, receiving a Daytime Emmy Award nomination for her performance in 1990. After this role, she continued in theater, which was an early love of hers, and began appearing in small guest roles on television to raise her profile. She went on to make guest appearances on a few other TV shows (including Star Trek: The Next Generation and Father Dowling Mysteries) before landing the recurring role of Ensign Ro Laren, a fiery, yet reserved Bajoran, in Star Trek: The Next Generation.

The producers of Star Trek invited Forbes to reprise Ro in the spin-off series Star Trek: Deep Space Nine, but Forbes declined the offer and decided to focus on a career in films.
She received praise, as well as a Saturn Award nomination from the Academy of Science Fiction, Fantasy & Horror Films, for her performance as photographer Carrie Laughlin in the 1993 thriller Kalifornia. This was followed with the lead female role in the 1994 black comedy Swimming with Sharks, as well as supporting roles in such films as The Road Killers, Just Looking and John Carpenter's 1996 science fiction/action sequel Escape from L.A.

She continued performing on television during this period, with guest spots on Seinfeld, The Outer Limits, and Star Trek: The Next Generation, to which she returned to tie up the Ro Laren storyline in the series' penultimate episode.

In 1996, Forbes joined the cast of NBC's popular police drama Homicide: Life on the Street, playing chief medical examiner Julianna Cox. She remained with the show for two years, then was let go as part of a major cast overhaul (the series would be canceled after one more season). However, she would reprise her role in the 2000 TV special Homicide: The Movie.

That same year, Forbes became a regular on Wonderland, an ABC series, but it was pulled from the air after only two episodes. Forbes was next seen in a recurring role on the police drama The District.

She was subsequently given roles in films such as 2001's Perfume and 2002's American Girl, as well as the 2001 British TV movie Messiah (for which she studied British sign language for a week) and its sequel installments: Messiah 2: Vengeance is Mine in 2002 and Messiah III in 2003. During the 2002–2003 TV season, Forbes played the recurring character of presidential aide Lynne Kresge on the second season of the action series 24.

She followed her role on 24 with a guest spot on Alias, then went on to play Admiral Helena Cain in three episodes of the re-imagining of the classic sci-fi series Battlestar Galactica, as well as appearing in the TV movie Battlestar Galactica: Razor. She followed this up with a recurring role as Agent Samantha Brinker on the drama Prison Break and guest starred on Boston Legal and Lost.

Forbes starred as the lead in the adaptation of the comic-book Global Frequency, the single produced episode of which infamously leaked online the following year, eight months after the series failed to be picked up by Warner Bros. networks.

Forbes returned to British television screens with guest roles in both Holby City and as a Mossad agent in Waking the Dead. In 2008, Forbes starred in two HBO drama series; In Treatment, portraying the wife of the central character, and in True Blood as a Maenad named Maryann Forrester.

She reprised her semi-regular roles in both series in their respective second seasons in 2009, as well as joining the cast of the Canadian psychological drama series Durham County for its second season as Dr. Penelope Verity.

Forbes played the role of Mitch Larsen in the US television series The Killing, a 2011 remake of the Danish crime series Forbrydelsen. Forbes appeared as Retro Girl in the TV series Powers. She also landed a prominent supporting role in The Hunger Games: Mockingjay – Part 2.

Forbes subsequently played Valerie Edwards in the TV series Berlin Station that aired on Epix from 2016 to 2019. Her character was a no-nonsense administrator who serves as a Berlin Station Internal Branch Chief.

In January 2021, it was announced that she would join the cast of the ABC drama Big Sky as matriarch Margaret Kleinsasser.

Personal life 
Forbes married actor Ross Kettle in 1990; the marriage ended in divorce.

Forbes has been a vegetarian since she was a teenager and became vegan in 2011.

Filmography

Film

Television

Video games

Awards and nominations

References

External links 

1965 births
American film actresses
American soap opera actresses
American television actresses
American video game actresses
American voice actresses
American actresses of Mexican descent
Living people
Actresses from Austin, Texas
20th-century American actresses
21st-century American actresses
Hispanic and Latino American actresses
High School for the Performing and Visual Arts alumni